The Curdies River is a perennial river of the Corangamite catchment, located in the Otways region of the Australian state of Victoria.

Location and features
From its highest point, the Curdies River descends  over its  course.

Curdies Inlet, when full, covers an area of around 280 hectares and is located near the mouth of the Curdies River. Reasonable fishing and birdwatching can be enjoyed in the inlet.

The mouth is periodically blocked by sand. Sometimes, in order to avoid flooding around Peterborough, it has to be opened by excavation.

The river was named after the first doctor in Cobden.

See also

 List of rivers of Victoria

References

External links

Corangamite catchment
Rivers of Barwon South West (region)
Otway Ranges